"Press" is a song written and performed by American rapper Cardi B, released as a single on May 31, 2019. The single was produced by Slade Da Monsta and Key Wane. It debuted and peaked at number 16 on the US Billboard Hot 100. The song has been certified platinum by the Recording Industry Association of America (RIAA). The parental advisory-labeled music video, starring Cardi B as a naked rampage killer facing a trial, marked her directorial debut.

Promotion
In December 2018, Cardi B posted a video to Instagram of her rapping part of the song. She later said that she was set to release it soon after, but decided to release the music video for "Money" instead. On May 27, 2019, Cardi B tweeted that the "single and official cover art drops this Friday 5/31". She shared the cover art of the single, which features her escorted out of a court room entirely naked by a group of men with paparazzi taking pictures of her.

Critical reception 
"Press" received generally positive reviews from critics, with many noting the evolution of the rapper's attitude towards the media in the lyrics from previous songs such as "Bartier Cardi" and her featured verse on husband Offset's single "Clout"; NME called the song "defiant", while Billboard labelled her as "pressing on" amid "bad press, haters, beefs". Pitchfork praised Cardi being "now fully ready to take aim at any haters" while noting the deviation between "non-stop cut-downs" and "goofier boasts about her money and sexual prowess"; the magazine also stated that the rapper had "sharpened her rapping abilities to deadly effect" in the song.

Music video

Cardi B announced that the video for "Press" would be released in June 2019 on her Twitter. The video was then officially released on June 26, 2019, on her YouTube account. It was directed by Jora Frantzis and co-directed by Cardi.  The parental advisory-marked music video has since received over 100 million views.

The video opens with Cardi B's character shooting a male and a female after having a threesome. Accused of murder, she then is arrested and taken to an interrogation, where she challenges the officers. She is seen leading a choreographed routine with a crew of nude dancers. She killed a courtroom jury and the dancers. The clip closes with her angrily drowning her cellmate in the toilet.

Live performances
The first televised performance of "Press" was when Cardi B performed live at the 2019 BET Awards, along with a performance of "Clout" featuring her husband Offset. Entertainment Weekly named it "the top moment" of the night in their review article. BET ranked the esmerald attire as the best performance outfit since their first show in 2001. Introduced by Drake, Cardi B opened her set at the 2019 OVO Fest performing "Press".

Charts

Weekly charts

Year-end charts

Certifications

Release history

References

External links 
 

2019 singles
2019 songs
Cardi B songs
Songs about the media
Music video controversies
Song recordings produced by Key Wane
Songs written by Cardi B
Songs written by Klenord Raphael